Quebo Airport  is an airstrip serving the adjacent towns of Quebo and Aldeia in the Tombali Region of Guinea-Bissau. Quebo's national airport code is GG64.

See also
 List of airports in Guinea-Bissau
 Transport in Guinea-Bissau

References

External links
OpenStreetMap - Quebo
Aldeia Formosa

Airports in Guinea-Bissau